Brinchang (also Berincang) is a town and hill resort located at an altitude of  in Cameron Highlands in the state of Pahang, Malaysia.

Brinchang is the highest and second largest township of Cameron Highlands, situated on a gently sloping plateau about 2 km after Tanah Rata or 3 km before Kea Farm. While relatively small in spread compared to Tanah Rata, Brinchang is the densest in development - a tourist hub with local flavours and style.

The epicentre of Brinchang is a tight pocket of shophouses—restaurants, stores and budget hotels, while the surroundings hold further commercial developments, holiday apartments and residential homes. Gunung Brinchang is the origin of the town's name.

Attractions

One of its attractions is the Night Market (moved to Golden Hills approximately 2km away) available during weekends and the Malaysian school holidays, where many vegetable stalls and food stalls are set up.

Transport

The road connecting Gunung Brinchang and Federal Route 59 at Brinchang is the highest motorable road in Malaysia.

Climate 
The Köppen-Geiger climate classification system classifies its climate as subtropical highland (Cfb). Temperatures are mild year-round albeit rainy. Two extra rainy seasons occur during the course of the year, with the shorter one running from April to May, and the longer one running from September to December.

References 

Cameron Highlands
Towns in Pahang